Chambre 12 (French for Room 12) is the debut studio album by French singer and actress Louane. It debuted at number one in her native France on the week of March 8, 2015, with 60,370 copies sold and was certified Gold in its first week.

At the end of 2015, it was announced as the second best-selling album of the year in France with 772,300 copies sold, and was certified 2× Diamond. It was also the second best-selling album of 2015 in the Walloon region of Belgium.

Track listing

Chart performance

Weekly charts

Year-end charts

Certifications and sales

References

French-language albums
2015 debut albums
Louane (singer) albums